, , or  is the Japanese word for "boy" or "minor".

Shōnen may also refer to:

 manga, Japanese comics aimed at a young teen male target-demographic

Music
Shōnen Alice, a 2004 album by Japanese singer Maaya Sakamoto
Shonen Knife, a Japanese pop punk band
Shonen Knife (album), a 1990 compilation album for the US market
Tokyo Shōnen, a Japanese rock band

People
, Japanese entomologist

Publications
Shōnen Maid, a Japanese manga series by Ototachibana
Shōnen Onmyōji, a Japanese light novel series by Mitsuru Yūki

Magazines
Shōnen Big Comic, a Japanese manga magazine published by Shogakukan
Shōnen Book, a Japanese manga magazine published by Shueisha
Shōnen Gaho, a Japanese manga magazine published by Shōnen Gahōsha
Shonen Jump (magazine), a North American manga magazine published by Viz Media
Shonen Magz, an Indonesian manga magazine published by Elex Media Komputindo
Shōnen Sekai, a Japanese manga magazine published by Hakubunkan
Shōnen Star, an Indonesian manga magazine published by Elex Media Komputindo
Shōnen Sunday Super, a Japanese manga magazine published by Shogakukan
Bessatsu Shōnen Magazine, a Japanese manga magazine published by Kodansha
Gekkan Shōnen Jets, a Japanese manga magazine published by Hakusensha
Monthly Shōnen Ace, a Japanese manga magazine published by Kadokawa Shoten
Monthly Shōnen Champion, a Japanese manga magazine published by Akita Shoten
Monthly Shōnen Jump, a Japanese manga magazine published by Shueisha
Monthly Shōnen Magazine, a Japanese manga magazine published by Kodansha
Monthly Shōnen Rival, a Japanese manga magazine published by Kodansha
Monthly Shōnen Sirius, a Japanese manga magazine published by Kodansha
Monthly Shōnen Sunday, a Japanese manga magazine published by Shogakukan
Weekly Shōnen Champion, a Japanese manga magazine published by Akita Shoten
Weekly Shōnen Jump, a Japanese manga magazine published by Shueisha
Weekly Shonen Jump (American magazine), a North American digital manga magazine published by Viz Media
Weekly Shōnen Magazine, a Japanese manga magazine published by Kodansha
Weekly Shōnen Sunday, a Japanese manga magazine published by Shogakukan

Other
 ( "boy love"), a genre of Japanese manga featuring romantic relationships between young boys
Shōnen Hollywood, a Japanese media franchise

See also
Japanese juvenile law, or 
Shōnen Jump (disambiguation)
Shōnen Sunday (disambiguation)
 (disambiguation)
 (disambiguation)